The enzyme guanidinodeoxy-scyllo-inositol-4-phosphatase (EC 3.1.3.40) catalyzes the reaction 

1-guanidino-1-deoxy-scyllo-inositol 4-phosphate + H2O  1-guanidino-1-deoxy-scyllo-inositol + phosphate

This enzyme belongs to the family of hydrolases, specifically those acting on phosphoric monoester bonds.  The systematic name is 1-guanidino-1-deoxy-scyllo-inositol-4-phosphate 4-phosphohydrolase. Other names in common use include 1-guanidino-scyllo-inositol 4-phosphatase, and 1-guanidino-1-deoxy-scyllo-inositol-4-P phosphohydrolase.

References

 

EC 3.1.3
Enzymes of unknown structure